The Study of Language is a textbook by George Yule in which the author provides an introduction to linguistics. It is described as a "highly influential and widely used introductory text on linguistics."

Reception
The book was reviewed by Innhwa Park, Sheila M. Embleton and Dan Liu.
It also received short reviews from  Nigel Musk (University of Linkoping), Stephen Matthews (University of Hong Kong) and Elise Morse-Gagne (Tougaloo College).

See also
Language: Introductory Readings

References

External links 
 The Study of Language

1985 non-fiction books
Linguistics textbooks
Cambridge University Press books